The basolia (or ) is a Ukrainian or Polish folk instrument of the bowed string family similar to the cello, although usually slightly larger and not as sophisticated in construction. The basolia was usually homemade and of very rough construction. Sometimes the soundboard was sewn to the body rather than glued. The strings are tuned in fifths.
 
Three different types are found in Ukraine:
1) 3 string found in Boiko ethnic area. The strings are usually plucked.
2) 4 string in central Ukraine. The strings are usually played with a bow.
3) 5 string from Transcarpathia. The strings are usually hit with a stick.

In Poland, the basolia has 2-4 strings, which are usually played with a bow.

It is now rarely found, almost totally replaced by the standard cello in Ukraine, or by the accordion in Poland.

The basolia was an instrument that was often ridiculed for its quality of sound and the skill of the player. All the same, wedding music without it was unthinkable. The basolia was introduced into Ukraine from the West after the fiddle had established itself, however, there are mentions which date back to the 17th century in descriptions of the wedding of Bohdan Khmelnytsky's son Yuri, where an orchestra using this instrument entertained the guests.

See also
Ukrainian folk music

Sources

Humeniuk, A. - Ukrainski narodni muzychni instrumenty - Kyiv: Naukova dumka, 1967
Mizynec, V. - Ukrainian Folk Instruments - Melbourne: Bayda books, 1984
 Cherkaskyi, L. - Ukrainski narodni muzychni instrumenty // Tekhnika, Kyiv, Ukraine, 2003 - 262 pages.

External links
Samples and Pictures of Ukrainian Instruments

Ukrainian musical instruments
Polish musical instruments
String instruments